Bazan Rural District is a rural district (dehestan) in the Central District of Javanrud County, Kermanshah Province, Iran. At the 2006 census, its population was 5,257, in 1,116 families. The rural district has 28 villages.

References 

Rural Districts of Kermanshah Province
Javanrud County